Gabriela Gerarda Traña Trigueros (born 3 March 1980 in Alajuela, Costa Rica) is a Costa Rican long-distance runner.

Biography
She competed in the marathon at the 2008 Summer Olympics and the 2012 Summer Olympics. In 2012, she was also the flag bearer for the Costa Rican team during the opening ceremony.

Personal bests
800 m: 2:12.8 min –  San José, 2003 
1500 m: 4:32.58 min –  Saint-Denis, 27 August 2003
3000 m: 9:50.56 min –  Huelva, 8 August 2004
5000 m: 17:15.20 min –  Huelva, 7 August 2004
10,000 m: 36:10.54 min –  Managua, 26 September 2004
Half marathon: 1:15:01 hrs –  Edinburgh, 27 May 2012
Marathon: 2:38:22 hrs –  Berlin, 25 September 2011
3000 m steeplechase: 10:59.80 min –  Ponce, 26 May 2006

Achievements

References

External links

1980 births
Living people
People from Alajuela
Costa Rican female marathon runners
Costa Rican female long-distance runners
Costa Rican steeplechase runners
Athletes (track and field) at the 2008 Summer Olympics
Athletes (track and field) at the 2012 Summer Olympics
Olympic athletes of Costa Rica
Athletes (track and field) at the 2011 Pan American Games
Pan American Games competitors for Costa Rica
Central American and Caribbean Games silver medalists for Costa Rica
Central American Games gold medalists for Costa Rica
Central American Games medalists in athletics
Central American Games silver medalists for Costa Rica
Central American Games bronze medalists for Costa Rica
Competitors at the 2010 Central American and Caribbean Games
Competitors at the 2014 Central American and Caribbean Games
Athletes (track and field) at the 2019 Pan American Games
Central American and Caribbean Games medalists in athletics
Competitors at the 2005 Summer Universiade
20th-century Costa Rican women
21st-century Costa Rican women